Sylvains-les-Moulins is a commune in the Eure department in Normandy in northern France. On 1 January 2016, the former commune Villalet was merged into Sylvains-les-Moulins.

Population

Personalities
 André Couteaux, writer, who adapted Mon oncle Benjamin on screen and wrote the novel Un monsieur de compagnie.
 Claude de Cambronne, French businessman
 Gilbert Renault (1904–1984),French resistant aka Colonel Rémy.

See also
Communes of the Eure department

References

Communes of Eure